I Vradyni, or simply Vradyni ("The Evening"), is an Athens-based nationally published weekly Greek newspaper. It has a liberal approach to the economy and is a traditional right-wing political orientation. The newspaper is published by Entypoekdotiki

Political interactions

In 1973, Vradyni published an open letter by former Prime Minister Konstantinos Karamanlis calling for the military regime to restore power to King Constantine, with the result that the Greek judiciary issued warrants for the paper's publisher and editor. On 2 December 1973, the paper was shut down by the Greek military police for publishing an article critical of the then-government's lack of action on re-establishing parliamentary rule.

References

Newspapers published in Athens
Publications with year of establishment missing
Daily newspapers published in Greece
Constantine II of Greece
Konstantinos Karamanlis